Padou is a French surname. Notable people with the surname include:

Henri Padou (1898–1981), French water polo player and swimmer
Henri Padou, Jr. (1928–1999), French swimmer

French-language surnames